Dubrovka is an urban locality (an urban-type settlement) in Vsevolozhsky District of Leningrad Oblast, Russia, located on the right bank of the Neva River northeast of Saint Petersburg. Municipally it is incorporated as Dubrovskoye Urban Settlement, one of the eight urban settlements in the district. Population:

History

The village of Dubrovo is known since 1500. By the 19th centuries, there were two villages, Vyborgskaya Dubrovka and Moskovskaya Dubrovka. In the end of the 19th century, it was a part of Shlisselburgsky Uyezd of Saint Petersburg Governorate (since 1914, Petrograd Governorate). On February 14, 1923 Shlisselburgsky Uyezd was merged into Petrogradsky Uyezd. In January 1924 the uyezd and the governorate were renamed Leningradsky. On May 26, 1927 Moskovskaya Dubrovka was granted urban-type settlement status and renamed Dubrovka.

On August 1, 1927, the uyezds were abolished and Leninsky District, with the administrative center in the settlement of Vsevolozhskoye, was established. The governorates were also abolished, and the district was a part of Leningrad Okrug of Leningrad Oblast. On July 23, 1930, the okrugs were abolished as well, and the districts were directly subordinated to the oblast. On August 19, 1930 Leninsky District was abolished and merged into newly established Leningradsky Prigorodny District with the administrative center in the city of Leningrad. On August 19, 1936 Leningradsky Prigorodny District was abolished, and the settlement was transferred into newly established Vsevolozhsky District, with the administrative center in the suburban settlement of Vsevolozhskoye. Dubrovka was destroyed by the German army in World War II. In 2009 in Dubrovka was built a church.

Economy

Industry
Dubrovka has a number of industrial enterprises, in particular, of chemical and construction industries.

Transportation

Dubrovka has the terminal station (Nevskaya Dubrovka station) on the railway from Saint Petersburg via Vsevolozhsk. Another station, 37 km, is located within the limits of the settlement as well. There is suburban service to the Finland Station in Saint Petersburg.

The settlement has a road access to the M18 highway which connects Saint Petersburg and Murmansk via Petrozavodsk.

The Neva river is navigable.

Culture and recreation
The district six objects classified as cultural and historical heritage of local significance. They commemorate the events of the Siege of Leningrad, when the front line was running on the Neva River, and Dubrovka was on the Soviet Army defense line. Soviet troops twice held the Nevsky Pyatachok, a tiny area on the left bank of the Neva opposite to Dubrovka, for an extended time in hope to develop a massive offensive.

The museum of the Nevsky Pyatachok is located in Dubrovka.

References

Notes

Sources

Urban-type settlements in Leningrad Oblast
Vsevolozhsky District
Shlisselburgsky Uyezd